Argentine Township may refer to the following places in the United States:

Argentine Township, Michigan
Argentine Township, Fall River County, South Dakota

Township name disambiguation pages